Taranis leptalea is a species of sea snail, a marine gastropod mollusk in the family Raphitomidae.

Description
The length of the shell attains 3.5 mm.

Distribution
This marine species was found off New England, USA

References

External links
 
  Bouchet, P.; Warén, A. (1985). Revision of the Northeast Atlantic bathyal and abyssal Neogastropoda excluding Turridae (Mollusca, Gastropoda). Bollettino Malacologico. supplement 1: 121-296

leptalea
Gastropods described in 1884